Lauris is a commune in the Vaucluse department in the Provence-Alpes-Côte d'Azur region in southeastern France.

It is located between the Luberon and the Durance river. The town has seen a rapid increase in population in since the 1980s from 1810 inhabitants in 1982 to 3354 inhabitants in 2006.

See also
 Côtes du Luberon AOC
Communes of the Vaucluse department

References

External links
 Official site of tourism office

Communes of Vaucluse